The 1955 Princeton Tigers football team was an American football team that represented Princeton University during the 1955 college football season. In their 11th year under head coach Charlie Caldwell, the Tigers compiled a 7–2 record and outscored opponents 139 to 66. Royce Flippin was the team captain.

This would be Princeton's final year as a football independent, as the Ivy League, which Princeton had helped co-found in 1954, began football competition in 1956. All seven Ivy League opponents appeared on Princeton's 1955 schedule; the Tigers had been playing most of their games against (future) Ivy teams for decades.

Princeton played its home games at Palmer Stadium on the university campus in Princeton, New Jersey.

Schedule

References

Princeton
Princeton Tigers football seasons
Princeton Tigers football